E464 may refer to:
 FS Class E464, a class of Italian railways electric locomotives
 Hydroxypropyl methylcellulose, an emulsifier